Zorion Eguileor (born 15 March 1946) is a Spanish actor, singer-songwriter and broadcaster. He is known for his role in The Platform.

Career
Eguileor's career in cinema and television in Spain began in the 1990s, in which he recorded appearances in productions such as  Salto al vacío and Qué grande es el teatro. In the 2000s he appeared in films such as 
La voz de su amo, Visionarios and La felicidad perfecta, and in the  RTVE series Cuéntame cómo pasó. Next, he appeared in Mi querido Klikowsky, La que se avecina, El tiempo entre costuras (literally "The Time Between Seams", English title: The Time in Between) and Estoy vivo.

References

Spanish male film actors
Spanish singer-songwriters
1946 births
Living people
20th-century Spanish male actors
21st-century Spanish male actors
Male actors from the Basque Country (autonomous community)
Spanish male television actors
People from Busturialdea